The Holyoke Housing Authority (HHA) is a public agency of the city of Holyoke, Massachusetts that provides subsidized public housing to low- and moderate-income families and individuals.

In the federal government model of the United States Department of Housing and Urban Development (HUD), HHA is a public housing agency. As such, HHA administers federal government assistance programs and monies for locally subsidized housing.

The Housing Authority owns and operates 12 developments, which contain 821 housing units. These include Beaudoin Village, Lyman Terrace, Toepfert Apartments, Churchill Homes, Zielinski Apartments, Coughlin Apartments, Beaudry-Boucher Apartments, Falcetti Apartments, Rosary Towers, the Murphy Congregate House, and Seibel Apartments. In addition to these sites, the agency also administers 1,400 Section 8 Housing Choice Vouchers for housing units in the private market.

The agency is overseen by a 5-member board of commissioners.  Four of the commissioners are appointed by the mayor and one commissioner is appointed by the Governor. 
Each year the HHA awards two scholarships through the Holyoke Community College Foundation to eligible students who are residents of public housing or Section 8 leased properties, meeting the required 12 credit enrollment for full-time students, and 6 credits for nontraditional students.

References

External links
 Holyoke Housing Authority, agency website

Public housing in the United States
1938 establishments in Massachusetts
Government of Holyoke, Massachusetts